Federalist No. 71 is an essay by Alexander Hamilton, the seventy-first of The Federalist Papers. It was published on March 18, 1788, under the pseudonym Publius, the name under which all The Federalist papers were published. Its title is "The Duration in Office of the Executive", and it is the fifth in a series of 11 essays discussing the powers and limitations of the executive branch.

It was published in the New York Packet in an effort to convince the people of New York to ratify the new Constitution. The papers were meant to urge New York and other states to ratify the proposed Constitution, which was a success at the end. This specific federalist paper stated that the government should serve the public good. The legislature would control the judicial and executive, so they can all come to agreements with any conflicts that may be argued. It was about deciding the duration of the presidential term in office and the advantages and disadvantages it had for the president. Having a certain duration develops personal firmness in the employment in his or her constitutional powers. It also sets up a stable system of administration adopted under his sponsorship.

Alexander Hamilton's view
Hamilton defended the provision of the constitution for a presidential term of four years. Against the argument that this was too long a term and would increase the risk of the president amassing too much power, Hamilton defended the four-year term due to the energy the president should attain. To him, having an energetic executive meant someone who holds true power and intelligence which was apparent when building a strong union. He argued that a term of four years would give the president the ability to counteract temporary passions or influences of faction that may from time to time convulse the American people and their representatives in Congress. According to Hamilton, it is the duty of the executive "to protect the interests of the people and the greater good of the nation, even when the people may, as a result of being deceived or manipulated, demand the adoption of flawed policy" (Gradesaver). He goes on to argue that a four-year term and the ability to run for reelection will make the president determined to pursue policies he believes will have the greatest impact. He thought that a term which is four years will give the president the ability to influence the American people and the representatives in Congress. According to Hamilton, it is the executive's responsibility to guard the nation's greater good even when the people mandate the acceptance of flawed policy. Four years will also enable the president to follow policies he feels are best after Congress approves. It is also enough time to commit to that position and not lose sight of why they are there in the first place.

Other proposals
When the paper was being made, there were other proposals put on the table for consideration. Some people decided to have two-year terms or eight-year terms. However, a two-year term was too short for the president to make a difference or even make a major move since the first year of presidency is supervised to determine presidential fitness; the first year is taken in settling in and understanding the dynamics of how to run the country. So, two years would essentially rush the president and make him have rash decisions. The president may not take the position seriously or feel like they could even make an impact on the country. On the other hand, eight-year term is too long especially if that president was to get reelected. The president might end up doing what is best for himself rather than what the nation needs.

What scholars thought was missing
The missing text in Federalist No. 71 is the "vital role that the legislature and the direct participation of the public has to play in achieving energetic public service that can provide safety in the regulatory process" (Federalist No. 71: Does Duration in Office Provide Vigilant Autonomy in the Regulatory Process?). Hamilton argued that duration in office provides some independence for the executive branch between the legislative branch. In the span of four years, or the duration of a particular regulatory term, expertise can be developed, processes can be established, and some autonomy of action can be taken place. This autonomy, Hamilton argued, provides a check against the passions or unwise opinions and points of view of the public. A steady, durable executive can be in tune with the public, compassionate, yet "withstand the temporary delusion" that may arise. Overall, the missing text avoids debates over executive versus legislative prominence in the government and refocuses the debate from evidence of dominance to administrative role in fostering a public services. This federalist paper also debates the sufficiency of executive duration in office and the stability of administration to foster these public service through regulation.

References

External links 

 Text of The Federalist No. 71: congress.gov

71
1788 in American law
1788 essays
1788 in the United States